is a Japanese idol girl group. They aim to "bring the cultures of Shibuya and Akihabara together". The group was formed by a former member of BiS and there are currently eight active members. The group performs regularly at TwinBoxAkihabara, in addition to performing live concerts in and outside of Japan. The group performed in Thailand at Japan Expo 2016. Their single "Summer☆Summer/セツナツリ" reached the 9th place on the Weekly Oricon Singles Chart.

History

2012: Formation and debut
Akishibu Project was formed in the late 2012,  and debuted officially with Thirteen members on May 24, 2013. However, the group's full scale start up begins in March 2014.

2018: Auditions and major debut
Auditions were held in early 2018 to find members to join the group prior to their major debut. Out of over 1,200 applicants, 21 were chosen to participate in the second round of auditions on SHOWROOM Live, a live-streaming website. Four girls were chosen from the 21 as new members. During their stage debut, Akishibu Project announced their major debut single, "Hola! Hola! Summer", would be released on August 15, 2018.

Members

Current members
Update: July 2018.

* All colour values are approximate.

1st Generation Members
 Rina Yokoyama (October 2012 – May 11, 2014)
 Hinako Kera
 Yue Miyatani
 Yuuna Arakawa
 Ishikawa Natsumi
 Ami Iseki
 Emiri Otani
 Emiri Suzuki
 Miiro Taguchi
 Rena Hayashi
 Miki Fujimoto
 Saori Funaki
 Kaori Miyako
 Sara Murayama

Discography

Albums

Singles

Notes

References

External links
  

Japanese idol groups
Japanese girl groups
Musical groups established in 2012
2012 establishments in Japan